Davit Niniashvili (born 14 July 2002) is a Georgian rugby union player. He plays as a winger for Lyon OU; in the Top 14, in France. Niniashvili also plays full-back for the Georgian National Team He participated in the 2019 European Under-18 Rugby Union Championship organised in Kaliningrad. He started in the final, which was won by Georgia.
Although only evolving in the regional league, being 18 years old and having no high-level experience, he was selected by Levan Maisashvili to participate in the Autumn Nations Cup. His coach presents him as "a promising player with good skills". He wants to "increase the depth [at the rear post]". 

Davit Niniashvili was named in the starting line-up for the first time at 2020 Rugby Europe Championship against Russia. He scored his first international try against Russia at 2021 Rugby Europe Championship

In 2021, he signed a three-year contract with Lyon. He made his debut in the Top 14 on September 18, 2021 against Perpignan.

List of winners
Winner of the European Rugby Championship for Under 18s in 2019
Winner of the 2021–22 EPCR Challenge Cup with Lyon OU

References

2002 births
Living people
Rugby union players from Georgia (country)
Lyon OU players
Rugby union fullbacks
Rugby union wings